Cecil H. Roy  (October 2, 1900 – January 26, 1995) was an American radio actress who was well known in radio broadcasting of the 1930s and 1940s as The Girl of a Thousand Voices.

Early life
Born in St. Paul, Minnesota, she grew up in Oklahoma. Her father was an opera singer.

Career
Soon entered radio during the 1930s, appearing on The Rise of the Goldbergs, The Henry Aldrich Show, Pepper Young's Family. Marthy and Elmer, and many other programs.

The "Girl of a Thousand Voices" label came about due to her ability to immediately shift through a wide range of characters and ages, from an elderly woman to a crying baby.

Roy's roles on radio programs included those shown in the following table.

She also was featured "enacting dilemmas" on Daily Dilemmas.

Animation
Between 1943 and 1964, she provided voices for numerous animated cartoons, specializing in children's voices, originating the voice  of Little Lulu.

She also did the voice of Casper in the Casper the Friendly Ghost theatrical animated series of the 1940s and 1950s.

Recordings
Her recordings for children included the role of Winnie the Pooh on a recording with Jimmy Stewart, and Cindy Bear on a Yogi Bear record. Through Replica Records, Roy released at least one 33 rpm recording ("Helen's Holiday"), as well as three 45 rpm recordings with Helen Searles Westbrook and Betty Barrie: 1) Buddy's Butterfly 2) The Thistle/Buddy's Garden 3) Christmas Eve/Plasco Toys.

Personal life
Roy spoke German and French and sang in Italian and French. She was reported to have a "polished repertoire of 20 dialects." Her long-time partner, Beni (missing last name), was a hairdresser in New York City. His clientele included many Broadway and vaudeville stars. Cecil Roy also lived in Cozy Lake, Oak Ridge, New Jersey. Her "summer" or weekend home was a place where she entertained many of the neighborhood children with her accordion, singing, and voice talents.

Death
In her last years, she lived in the Actors' Fund Home Extended Care Facility in Englewood, New Jersey, where she died in 1995 at age 94. She was survived by her son, Richard, of Montclair, New Jersey; four grandchildren and nine great-grandchildren.

References

External links

1900 births
1995 deaths
American radio actresses
20th-century American actresses
Actresses from Saint Paul, Minnesota
Paramount Pictures contract players
Famous Studios people